Plastic and Reconstructive Surgery is a peer-reviewed medical journal and the official publication of the American Society of Plastic Surgeons. It covers all aspects of plastic and reconstructive surgery, including operative procedures, clinical or laboratory research, and case reports.

References

External links 
 

Surgery journals
Monthly journals
English-language journals
Lippincott Williams & Wilkins academic journals
Publications established in 1946